Englishkaran is a 2005 Tamil-language comedy film. It stars Sathyaraj and Namitha, while Vadivelu, Madhumitha Siva Balaji, and Santhanam play supporting roles. "Englishkaran" with the tagline "Tamizh Vazhga" is a film from the hit combo from Sathyaraj and Shakthi Chidambaram whose earlier ventures "Ennamma Kannu" and "Maha Nadigan" were hits. Englishkaran also has humour, glamour, many puns and is based on a strong theme paced with whimsy humour. The film opened to positive reviews.

Plot
The film starts with Thamizharasan (Sathyaraj), a reformist who enters a village with the intention to unite a couple and help a young girl named Sandhya (Madhumitha), who aspires to be a singer. Bala (Siva Balaji) is in love with Sandhya. Thamizharasan faces the anger of Sandhya's father (Dhandapani), a strong believer of older ideologies. Sandhya hates Thamizharasan, and the reason for that is told in a flashback, which starts with Thamizharasan's wife Maheswari (Namitha) aspiring to be a sports champion. Theepori Thirumugam (Vadivelu) is Maheswari's uncle. Thamizharasan helps her. Due to some family problems, Maheswari kills herself after making her husband promise to help her sister to become a popular singer. The rest of the film is how Thamizharasan fulfills Maheshwari's promise and helps unite Bala and Sandhya.

Cast 

 Sathyaraj as Thamizharasan
 Namitha as Maheswari
 Vadivelu as "Theeppori" Thirumugam
 Madhumitha as Sandhya
 Siva Balaji as Bala
 Santhanam as Bala's friend
 Jaya Murali as Maheshwari and Sandhya's mother
 Sathyapriya as Thamizharasan's mother
 Aishwarya as Angalaparameswari
 Dhandapani as Maheshwari and Sandhya's father
 K. S. G. Venkatesh as Doctor Dhamodharan 
 Pawan as Angalaparameswari's son
 Singamuthu as "Neruppu" Neelamegam
 Bonda Mani as Thirumugam's friend
 Bava Lakshmanan as Thirumugam's friend
 Halwa Vasu as Thirumugam's friend
 Vijay Ganesh as Thirumugam's friend
 Krishnamoorthy as Thirumugam's friend
 Balu Anand as Villager
 Vengal Rao as Beggar
 Velmurugan as Bala's friend
 Ganeshkar as Bala's friend
 Chaplin Balu as Bala's friend
 Kili Ramachandran as Bala's friend
 Besant Ravi as Angalaparameswari's henchman
 Kovai Senthil as Priest
 Suruli Manohar as Kutty Samiyar
 Rajkrishna as Seth
 Deva as Himself (cameo appearance)

Soundtrack

Soundtrack was composed by Deva and released on Bayshore.

Critical reception
Indiaglitz commented that Sakthi Chidamabaram had tried to give a movie with a strong message with a convoluted mix of humour, romance and glamour.

References

External links

2005 films
Films scored by Deva (composer)
2000s Tamil-language films
Films directed by Sakthi Chidambaram